Prausnitz is a German language surname.  Notable people with the surname include:

Moshe Prausnitz (1922–1998), Israeli archaeologist

Wilhelm Prausnitz (1861–1933) Prussia born, Austrian-German professor

Frederik Prausnitz (1920–2004), German-born American conductor and teacher

Otto Prausnitz (1876–1963), German physician, bacteriologist, and hygienist

John Prausnitz (born 1928), American professor of chemical engineering

 Mark Prausnitz American chemical engineer, scientist, educator, entrepreneur, and inventor

German-language surnames